The surname Berthold may refer to:
Arnold Adolph Berthold (1803–1861), German physiologist and zoologist
Avgust Berthold (1880–1919), Slovene photographer
David Berthold, Australian theatre director
Rudolf Berthold (1891–1920), German WWI flying ace
Thomas Berthold (born 1964), former German footballer and soccer coach
Richard Berthold (born 1946), American professor of history (retired)

See also
Bertholds (disambiguation)
Berchtold (surname)

German-language surnames